Ralph Ridpath Roberts (October 16, 1897 - December 23, 1981) was the Doorkeeper of the United States House of Representatives from c. 1943 until 1947, a period covering the latter portion of the 78th United States Congress and the entire of the 79th, and 
was Clerk of the United States House of Representatives from 1949 until 1953 and again from 1955 until 1967. Roberts, who was born in Indiana, served the 81st, 82nd, 84th, 85th, 86th, 87th, 88th and 89th United States Congresses. Roberts died on December 23, 1981, at the age of 84.

References

1897 births
1981 deaths
Clerks of the United States House of Representatives
People from Indiana